Unami Creek is a  tributary of Perkiomen Creek in Lehigh, Bucks, and Montgomery counties, Pennsylvania in the United States.

Unami Creek (named for the Unami people, whose name comes from the Unami ) begins in Lower Milford Township just northwest of the Bucks County border and west of Zionhill, crosses Milford Township and Marlborough Township, and joins Perkiomen Creek near Perkiomenville. It was formerly called Swamp Creek. The name now applies to the current day West Swamp Creek.

Bridges
Sutch Road Bridge in Marlborough Township
Swamp Creek Road Bridge

See also
List of rivers of Pennsylvania

References

Rivers of Pennsylvania
Tributaries of the Schuylkill River
Rivers of Montgomery County, Pennsylvania